Marron is a name given to two closely related species of crayfish in Western Australia. Formerly considered a single species, it is now recognised as comprising two species, the critically endangered Cherax tenuimanus, and the species that is outcompeting it, C. cainii.

Marron are considered a luxury product and are the subject of a developing aquaculture industry in Western Australia and other Australian states. Total Australian production of farmed marron was 30 tons in 1996. In Western Australia, recreational fishing for marron is tightly controlled, with a limited season, permits are required, and minimum sizes are enforced.

Marron have been introduced to Kangaroo Island in South Australia, where they have been commercially farmed, and have established feral populations in local waterways.

References

External links 
 Fisheries Western Australia – Marron Fact Sheet
 Marron Recreational Fishing in Western Australia
 Farming Marron in Western Australia
 Marron Grower's Association of Western Australia
 Marron101 – The Consumer Marron website from the Marron Growers Association

Parastacidae
Freshwater crustaceans of Australia
Fauna of Western Australia
Edible crustaceans
Australian cuisine